The Taman Wahyu Komuter station is a Malaysian commuter train station located in the east side of and named after located at Taman Wahyu, Kuala Lumpur.

History
This station was known as Kent Halt or Kent station during British colonial rule.

In 2012, a woman in her fifties fell on to the tracks and was killed by a train.

See also
 List of rail transit stations in Klang Valley

References

Railway stations in Kuala Lumpur
Seremban Line